Jacob Mącznik (4 December 1905 – 10 May 1945) was a Polish-French, Jewish artist, a young painter of the École de Paris until its destruction by the Nazis. Alternative versions of his family name that have been used include Macznik, Moncznik, and Montchnik.  Alternative versions of his first name are Jakub, Yankel, Jankel, Yakov, and Yank'l.

Édouard Roditi, the poet, essayist, surrealist author, scholar, critic, translator and art historian, wrote of Mącznik that he was "among the more prominent artists who died as victims of Nazi extermination camps," that he was "gifted with outstanding" "individual talent," and that had he "lived to profit from the post-war international boom in contemporary art," he "might indeed have now enjoyed considerable fame."

Encyclopaedia Judaica notes of the École de Paris victims, "Among the more prominent artists who died as victims of Nazi extermination camps were [seventeen painters are then listed, including] "... Jacob Macznik 1905–1944 [sic] ..."  The entry continues, "These martyred artists were gifted with such outstanding and diverse talents that it would now be as unfair to try to force them all into a Jewish school as it was, under the Nazi regime, to deny them their human rights because they were Jews.

Early life
Mącznik was the first of seven children in an orthodox, Aleksander Khassidic family in Łódź, Poland.  His family moved to Potok, near Kielce, during World War I likely for financial reasons.  While in Kielce, he fell in love with drama, and gave theatrical performances with his friends. Jacob and his family left Kielce in 1921, moving back to Łódź.  An art student sparked his interest in art, and took him to Warsaw. Very soon after arrival in Warsaw, the friend abruptly needed to depart to Danzig (now Gdańsk) for family reasons, leaving Mącznik on his own.

He studied at the School of Fine Arts and worked in Warsaw, but grew nostalgic for home, and so eventually returned to his parents in Łódź, where he tried to paint.  From there, several trips revealed to him the charm of landscapes.

In 1928, he was wed and later the same year arrived with his wife in Paris.  He painted and they both worked.

In 1931, Macznik's works were first shown in Paris. It was in the autumn 1931 exhibition of Jeune Europe Young Europe, a combined library and gallery owned and directed by the Italian writer Antonio Aniante. Aniante wrote:

"The YOUNG EUROPE is opening this year to present first of all the new paintings of the Polish painter Jacob Macznik who for the first time in Paris exhibited at my place in autumn 1931. I consider Macznik (with Carlo Levi and Halé Asaf) as the best painter of my new avant garde troupe. Macznik moves away from them with this surprising quality of populist artist. Here is Mr. Therives, a follower for your movement. Macznik arises from the people and suffering, but also from love. You will find in these paintings, the joy of freedom and the charm of poverty rendered without any artifice. Macznik is a realist, all honesty and all faith. He is a poet, a thinker, a wise man who expresses himself in color and form. Having understood his past, his present, and his future, and being the first to encourage it, to impress the crowd, here is the best book I have written this year."

André Thérive and Léon Lemonnier launched "populism" in France approximately 1929. Thérive was a writer, novelist, journalist, and French literary critic. Lemonnier was a writer, literary critic, and French biographer. In this setting, and at that time, the word "populist" had a very different meaning from that of today; it was defined by the professor William Leonard Schwartz as the antonym of snobbism.  Lemonnier wrote, "Populism is a reaction founded on the realistic tradition and directed against the literature of analysis.  It is a call to an art based on observation and sincerity.  It entails sympathy for the chosen subject-matter and in particular sympathy for the people. ... It designates on the one hand any work dealing with the common people, whatever its purpose may be, and on the other hand any book which is a continuation of the realistic tradition and which reacts against preciosity [overrefinement in art, music, or language] in thought or style. ... Populism is a return to reason."

In 1932, Raymond Sélig wrote (translated from French),
     "Près de la Fenêtre [Before the Window] and Vue d'une Fenêtre [View of a Window] are the titles of two very personal works ... by Jacob Macznik.  In these two compositions, filled with a deep and lived emotion, the artist pursues his favorite quest in art, which aims to achieve an extreme simplicity, while not losing sight, of the expressiveness of beauty in its most absolute and definitive tone.
     "She is truly perfectly sincere, this woman sitting near the window busily reading, while in the background, a perspective unfolds of roofs bristling with usual Parisian chimneys."
     ...
     After arriving in Paris in 1928, Sélig wrote that Macznik had to work, leaving for painting only little time, yet "He employs so perfectly the sparse bits of the latter that he is well spoken of, and in the process creating a reputation for himself composed of that irresistible individualism and that innate personality which are his two most precious qualities."

Macznik had a solo exhibition at Jeune Europe, this time 15 October – 1 November 1932.  He had a group show at Jeune Europe November 1932.  He had a solo exhibition at the Federation of Jewish Societies—the year is uncertain, but it was either 1932 or 1937.  There was also an exhibition at Galerie d'Art Jack, in Nevers, France, of the works of four artists, Mane-Katz, Flexor, Dobrinsky and Mącznik, 13 September to 13 October 1935.  His works also appeared in a group exhibition at the Salon des Tuileries in 1939.

Chil Aronson claimed in his 1963 book that he proposed to Macznik in 1936 that the latter travel to Poland to paint old, wooden synagogues.  Hersh Fenster states in his 1951 book that Macznik proposed to him in the spring of 1937 that the two travel to Poland, saying (translated from Yiddish), "I will paint there and you will write".  He continued, "There will come a storm and there will not remain any traces of them, of the Jewish monuments" (or "memorials").

Fenster and Mącznik did travel east in a personal project of resistance art.  Fenster wrote that Mącznik first went to Prague to paint the Old New Synagogue.  Two paintings of it are known to have then been done.  One is missing; the other is in the collection of Mącznik's nephew (Samson Munn, U.S.A.).  There is a photograph of Macznik and Fenster in the archives of Museum of Art and History of Judaism (MAHJ), in Sandomierz; a facsimile is available online.  The writings of Fenster, if they ever existed, have never been found.  Two sets of originals of the watercolors/gouaches of Mącznik are known to exist.  Some details of their journey may be found in the Mącznik chapter of Fenster's book.

When World War II broke out in France, September 1939, Mącznik and his wife were in Auvergne.  Rather than return to Paris, they traveled to Toulouse.  Later, they were assigned to forced housing in Loures-Barousse, in the Pyrenées.  Depending on the report, he either joined or certainly tried to join the French resistance.  In 1963, Aronson reported that in early-mid September 1943, he happened on Mącznik and his wife purely by chance at a café in Nice.  Very soon, as early as one day later, arrests began; Mącznik and his wife were arrested, and deported to Drancy 1 October 1943, arriving there 5 October.  From Drancy, he was sent 28 October 1943 to Auschwitz on transport train 901/51, arriving there 31 October.  On 18 January 1945, starving, he was evacuated via forced march (a so-called "death march"), many miles through a blizzard, eventually to a train to the so-called "concentration camp" at Mauthausen, actually more a death camp, arriving there 25 January, and 29 January 1945 to the Ebensee slave-labor division of Mauthausen.  Murdered by the Nazis, he died in Ebensee 10 May 1945, four days after the camp was taken over by the Allies.

References

Jewish painters
Polish painters
1905 births
1945 deaths
People from Łódź
Polish Jews who died in the Holocaust
Polish emigrants to France
People who died in Mauthausen concentration camp
Auschwitz concentration camp prisoners